The Al-Istighfar Mosque is a mosque in Pasir Ris, Singapore.

The mosque is wheelchair accessible as there are ramps and a lift that serves all floors. The mosque is fully air conditioned in all of the prayer halls. As the number of Muslims in the neighbourhood increases, the mosque is overcrowded due to the high demand during peak periods such as Friday prayers and Ramadan night prayers.

On the 27 January 2017, the Masjid Al-Istighfar opened a new temporary prayer facility located opposite the mosque. This is to cater to the large number of Muslim worshippers for its Friday prayers.

To be scheduled to be completed by end-December 2018, overflow prayer spaces are built to meet with the ever increasing worshippers every Fridays. These overflow spaces are tiled with rows where worshippers can pray accordingly. Large fans are installed on the metal roof so worshippers can pray comfortably. Additionally, ablution spaces are built along the perimeter of the upgraded mosque.

This brings the total capacity of the mosque combined with the temporary prayer facility to more than 3,800 worshippers.

The mosque will be redeveloped in the near future according to the Islamic Religious Council of Singapore (MUIS)

Transportation
The mosque is accessible from Pasir Ris MRT station by transferring to bus services 5, 6 & 89.

See also
 Masjid Darul Ghufran
 Islam in Singapore
 List of mosques in Singapore

References

External links 

Majlis Ugama Islam Singapura, MUIS (Islamic Religious Council of Singapore)
List of Mosques in Singapore managed by MUIS : Masjid Al-Istighfar

1999 establishments in Singapore
Mosques completed in 1999
Istighfar
Pasir Ris
20th-century architecture in Singapore